Capitol High School may refer to:

 Capitol High School (Baton Rouge), Louisiana, US
 Central High School (Detroit), formerly known as Capitol High School

See also 
 Capital High School (disambiguation)
 Capitol Hill High School